Matthew John Kane (November 28, 1863 – January 2, 1924) was a justice of the Oklahoma Supreme Court from 1907 to 1923, serving as chief justice from 1909 to 1912. A native of New York state, he earned a law degree at Georgetown University.  Joining the Land Run of 1889 in Indian Territory, he settled in Kingfisher, Oklahoma.

Biography

Early life
Matthew John Kane was born to Anthony and Mary (Dunn) Kane of Niagara County, New York on November 28, 1863. He was the eldest of seven siblings. He graduated from Georgetown University in the class of 1886 with a law degree, Kane then went west to Wichita and to Harper, Kansas, before joining the Land Run of 1889 in Indian Territory. After the run, he settled in Kingfisher, Oklahoma, and soon became chief deputy for Pat Nagle, the U.S. Marshal in Oklahoma.

Political career in Oklahoma
Kane became a delegate to the Oklahoma Constitutional Convention, shortly before the granting of statehood. He was also a delegate to the Universal Congress of Lawyers and Jurists, in St. Louis, 1904.

Service on the Supreme Court
After Oklahoma officially became a state on November 16, 1907, Kane was one of the judges appointed to the first session of the Oklahoma Supreme Court. Jesse James Dunn was appointed at the same time. Since both had the same seniority and would have represented the same judicial district, they agreed that Dunn should serve during the first term (1908-9) while Kane should serve during the second (1910–11). The issue was permanently resolved when Dunn resigned the seat in 1913 to move to California.

A brief summary of Justice Kane's life on the Oklahoma Supreme Court indicate that he established important precedents for the state in his arguments concerning taxation and the descent and distribution of Indian lands.

Family
Kane married Miss Kathleen Reagan (1883–1968) of St. Paul County, Kansas on June 9, 1908. They had three children: Matthew John, Jr., Kathleen and Anthony Reagan Kane.  Justice Kane's great-grandson Matthew John Kane IV followed in his footsteps, being appointed to the Oklahoma Supreme Court by Governor Kevin Stitt in September 2019.

Matthew John Kane award
The Knights of Columbus in Oklahoma presents its Matthew John Kane public service award to individuals who have performed significant service to the Catholic Church and Oklahoma. Its namesake was the first Roman Catholic to become a justice on the Oklahoma Supreme Court.

Notes

References

External links

Justices of the Oklahoma Supreme Court
1863 births
1924 deaths
People from Kingfisher, Oklahoma
Lawyers from Oklahoma City
People from Niagara County, New York
Georgetown University alumni
19th-century American lawyers